Sammamish High School (commonly Sammamish or SHS) is a public secondary school in Bellevue, Washington, US, serving students in grades 9–12. Opened in 1959, the school was the second of the four traditional high schools in the Bellevue School District, with admission based primarily on the locations of students' homes. The school was entirely rebuilt over two renovations completed, respectively, in 2004 and 2017.
The school's nickname is the Redhawks, the mascot is the Bird, and its colors are red, black, and white.

Sammamish generally serves students from the east zone of the district, but students from outside its attendance area can enroll at the school through its open enrollment policy. Sammamish High's feeder elementary schools are Cherry Crest, Stevenson, Lake Hills, Phantom Lake, and Spiritridge. Its feeder middle schools are Odle and Tillicum.

Demographics
In the 2017–18 school year, the total student enrollment was 1,105.  The racial demographics are: 6% Black/African American, 21% Asian, 19% Hispanic, 7% Multi-Ethnic, 46% white, and less than 1% American Indian, Alaska native, Native Hawaiian, and Pacific Islander.  36% qualify for free or reduced lunches. 33% of students speak a first language other than English.

Academics
Sammamish is well known for its magnet programs (Sammamish Visual and Performing Arts Center),  Advanced Placement classes,  and career and technical programs (commonly referred to as CTE classes)  Sammamish was named the Washington state recipient of 2006–07 Siemens Awards of Advanced Placement. This award recognizes the excellence of Sammamish's Advanced Placement instruction and student performances.

Starting with the 2007–08 academic year, Sammamish switched from a 4-period daily block schedule to a 7-period schedule. Then-principal Laura Bang-Knudsen and Program Delivery Council Facilitator George Westergaard cited the need for a waiver, lack of sufficient faculty, parent or student support to get the waiver and inability to come up with a schedule that would not require a waiver and would not sacrifice curriculum coverage time.

Advanced Placement

Sammamish offers Advanced Placement classes. 9th graders are required to take AP Human Geography.  From 2002 through 2006, Sammamish students' scores counted for over 50% of all the passing exams in AP Calculus BC for the entire state.

Sammamish was ranked as #168 in 2008, #108 in 2007, #193 in 2006, #225 in 2005, and #141 in 2003 out of all the high schools in United States by Newsweek Magazine. The ranking is based on the number of Advanced Placement and/or International Baccalaureate tests taken divided by number of graduating seniors. All five high schools in the district are consistently ranked as the top five high schools in Washington state since the inception of the Newsweek ranking. The validity of these rankings is disputed for various reasons, such as that Sammamish's lack of an IB program deflates its rating as compared to its neighbor Interlake High School.

Athletics
Sammamish is a member of the Kingco Athletic Conference, in WIAA Class 2A (formerly 3A and 4A). Twenty two  sports are played over the course of three seasons at Sammamish, with Cheer and Drill active year-round. Past statistics can be found at the WIAA website.

This list only includes school championship games and does not include the 55 individual and group first place championships and 11 second-place finishes in track and field, cross country, swimming, golf, gymnastics, tennis, and wrestling.

Activities
Sammamish High School is home to a variety of extracurricular activities. Associated Student Body and administrators coordinate these throughout the schoolyear. Academically, the school houses chapters of the National Honor Society, National Arts Honor Society, Tri-M (Music Honor Society), Mu Alpha Theta (National Math Honor Society), and as of the 2006–07 school year, a successful and competitive Policy/Lincoln Douglas Debate team, which has competed at the semi-final level of the Auburn Regional Forensics Invitational.

An active Multicultural Club conducts events to demonstrate the diversity of the student body and coordinates the annual "Taste of Sammamish" culinary festival. Also, the Arts Magnet Program creates opportunities for students to participate in actual production. Other clubs include the Black Student Union and the LGBTQ club. Sammamish is home to Thespian Troupe 2241. The school's theater opened early in 2005 and cost the district $4.5 million. It is now home to at least two student productions each year. The theater contains professional equipment and is sometimes available to outside groups for rent, making it the third professional-quality theater in King County, Washington.  

Sammamish Graphic Arts students often participate in state and regional graphics competitions. The school offers a fully functional hot glass studio and extensive programs centered on Health care. The jazz choir has won numerous awards, and along with jazz band competes in the Lionel Hampton Jazz Festival each year. Jazz choir was recently featured in Bellevue Community College's Vocal Jazz Invitational with its award-winning vocal jazz ensemble Celebration!.  In February 2007, Sammamish won 1st Runner-up in the most competitive Multi-Mic Division at Lionel Hampton Jazz Festival. Sammamish also houses a FIRST Robotics Competition team, and a FIRST Tech Challenge team, 2412(Robototes), and 16750(Technototes) respectively. In April 2022, Sammamish students won the 2022 WSU Business Plan Competition with their pillow company, Perfect Pillow.

Notable alumni
 Chance Fry, professional soccer player
Megan Hilty, Tony nominated Broadway actress (attended Sammamish, but later transferred to the Washington Academy of Performing Arts in Redmond and later the Chrysalis School in Woodinville)
Linea Johnson, author of Perfect Chaos and mental health advocate
 John LeRoy, professional baseball player (1997)
 Rob McKenna, Attorney General of Washington (2005–2013)
 Carol Sealey, Canadian Olympic basketball player
Ann Wilson, musician, co-founder of Heart

References

External links

Bellevue School District

High schools in King County, Washington
Bellevue School District
Educational institutions established in 1959
Public high schools in Washington (state)
Magnet schools in Washington (state)
1959 establishments in Washington (state)